Bachorza may refer to the following places:
Bachorza, Kuyavian-Pomeranian Voivodeship (north-central Poland)
Bachorza, Łosice County in Masovian Voivodeship (east-central Poland)
Bachorza, Sokołów County in Masovian Voivodeship (east-central Poland)
Bachorza manor, a neo-classical manor house
Bachorza, Warmian-Masurian Voivodeship (north Poland)